Central Washington University–Lynnwood is Central Washington University's satellite campus in Lynnwood, Washington, United States.

Edmonds College and Central Washington University have worked together since 1975 to meet the higher education needs of Snohomish County. After earning a transfer degree online or on campus from any community college, students can continue their studies for a bachelor's degree from Central Washington University–Lynnwood in Snoqualmie Hall, a shared facility on the Edmonds CC campus.

The bachelor's degrees include: business administration, accounting, law & justice, information technology and administrative management, interdisciplinary studies - social sciences.

External links
 Central Washington University-Lynnwood
 Edmonds Community College
 Central Washington University

Public universities and colleges in Washington (state)
Educational institutions established in 1975
Universities and colleges in Snohomish County, Washington
Lynnwood, Washington